Donnersmarck is a surname. Notable people with the surname include:

Countess Henckel von Donnersmarck, also known as La Païva (1819–1884), the most successful of 19th century French courtesans
Florian Henckel von Donnersmarck (born 1973), German film director, best known for writing and directing The Lives of Others, The Tourist and Never Look Away
Guido Henckel von Donnersmarck (1830–1916), German nobleman, industrial magnate, and one of the richest men of his time
Henckel von Donnersmarcks, a Silesian noble family from the former region of Spiš in Upper Hungary, now in Slovakia
Hugo Henckel von Donnersmarck (1811–1890), German-Austrian entrepreneur

See also
Donnerjack

German business families
German-language surnames